Atlético Levante Unión Deportiva is a Spanish football team based in Valencia, in the namesake community. Founded in 1962, it is the reserve team of Levante UD, and for the 2022–23 season plays in the Tercera Federación – Group 6.

History
The club was founded on 10 November 1962 after a merger between Club Deportivo Portuarios (founded in 1952) and Unión Deportiva Malvarrosa (founded in 1926), with the latter already having partnerships with Levante UD. The new side was named Club Atlético Levante until 1976, when it changed to Levante UD Aficionados.

In 1994, after the first team became a Sociedad Anónima Deportiva, the reserve side was renamed Levante UD B. In 2014, the club returned to the name of Atlético Levante in an attempt to return to the name of the club in their foundation.

Club names
Club Atlético Levante - (1962–76)
Levante UD Aficionados - (1976-94)
Levante UD B - (1994–2014)
Atlético Levante UD - (2014– )

Season to season

As Unión Deportiva Malvarrosa

2 seasons in Tercera División

As Club Deportivo Portuarios

5 seasons in Tercera División

As Atlético Levante / Levante B
As a farm team

As a reserve team

11 seasons in Segunda División B
1 season in Segunda División RFEF
17 seasons in Tercera División
1 season in Tercera Federación

Honours
Tercera División: 2017–18

Players

Current squad
.

Club officials

Current technical staff

Notable players

 Isaac Danzo
 Dani Cárdenas

Notable coaches
 José Ángel Moreno
 José Luis Oltra

References

External links
Official website 
Futbolme team profile 

Football clubs in the Valencian Community
 
Association football clubs established in 1962
Spanish reserve football teams
1962 establishments in Spain